O R C A S is the self-titled debut full-length album from American dreampop duo Orcas.

Track listing
 "Pallor Cedes"
 "Arrow Drawn"
 "Standard Error"
 "Carrion"
 "A Subtle Escape"
 "Until Then (Broadcast cover)"
 "Certain Abstractions"
 "I Saw My Echo"
 "High Fences"

Credits
Benoît Pioulard - vox, guitars, piano, glockenspiel, field recordings, warnophone & harmonium
Rafael Anton Irisarri - laptop, guitars, bass & sampler

Additional Personnel:
Jesy Fortino - vocal samples on "Standard Error" and "Certain Abstractions"
Scott Morgan - drone loop on "Certain Abstractions"
Simon Scott - Max/MSP treatments & additional guitars on "A Subtle Escape" and "I Saw My Echo"
Kelly Wyse - Piano on "Standard Error", "I Saw My Echo" & "Certain Abstractions"
Photography/Artwork by Sean Curtis Patrick / The Attempted Theft of Millions 
Design by Julia Guther

References

External links
"ORCAS" @ Morr Music

2012 albums
Morr Music albums